Sarreguimines Football Club is a French football club from Sarreguemines, Moselle, Lorraine. Founded in 1919 and formerly known as Association sarreguiminois de football 93, it plays in the Regional 1, Lorraine, the sixth level of the French football league system, following relegation in 2020.

History
The team reached the last 32 of the 2015–16 Coupe de France, defeating SC Schiltigheim, and Dijon FCO and Valenciennes FC of Ligue 2, before losing to fellow fifth-tier team US Granville.

Current squad

References

External links
Official website

Association football clubs established in 1919
1919 establishments in France
Football clubs from former German territories
Sport in Moselle (department)
Football clubs in Grand Est